501 Züm Queen is a bus rapid transit route in Brampton, Ontario that is part of the Züm network.

Route 501 and 501A branches operates eastward along Queen Street from the Downtown Brampton Terminal, with the 501C branch originating at the Bramalea Terminal. The base route continues along Highway 7 in Vaughan and terminates at Vaughan Metropolitan Centre subway station. The A and C branches provide standard BRT service on Queen Street as far east as Highway 427 before travelling express through Vaughan to York University via Highway 407.

501 Züm Queen shares routing with York Region Transit's Viva Orange express bus route between Martin Grove and Vaughan Metropolitan Centre, and has been fare integrated with it since its creation. Both Brampton Transit and York Region Transit proofs of payment (Presto-marked transfers for riders paying cash) are accepted for the entire length of both bus routes. As of September 4, 2018, only the A and C branches of 501 Züm Queen service York University station.

Stops

Notes

See also
 Viva Orange
 Vaughan Metropolitan Centre station
 561 Züm Queen West

References

Züm bus routes
2010 establishments in Ontario